Kossiwa Monsila was a Togolese politician. She  was one of six women elected to the Parliament of Togo in 1979; the others were Abra Amedomé, Cheffi Meatchi, Essohana Péré, Zinabou Touré, and Adjoavi Trenou.

References

Year of birth missing
Possibly living people
Members of the National Assembly (Togo)
20th-century Togolese women politicians